The 2001 Volleyball America's Cup was the fourth edition of the annual men's volleyball tournament, played by six countries from North-, Central- and South America. The tournament was held from September 28 to October 7, 2001 in Buenos Aires, Argentina.

Squads

Main Round

Friday September 28

Saturday September 29

Sunday September 30

Monday October 1

Tuesday October 2

Wednesday October 3

Thursday October 4

Final round

Semi-finals
Saturday 2001-10-06

Finals
Sunday 2001-10-07 — Bronze Medal Match

Sunday 2001-10-07 — Gold Medal Match

Final ranking

Awards
Most Valuable Player

Best Spiker

Best Receiver

Best Blocker

Best Digger

Best Server

Best Setter

References
 Sports123
 Results
  Volleyball Almanac

Volleyball America's Cup
A
A
Volleyball
 Sports competitions in Buenos Aires